James Mulwana (24 July 1936 – 15 January 2013), was a Ugandan businessman. He was the Group chairman and chief executive officer of the Mulwana Group of Companies, a diverse business conglomerate with interests in dairy farming, plastics, manufacturing, and real estate. From 1992 until his death in 2013, Mulwana served as a non-executive director on the board of directors of Standard Chartered Uganda, the second-largest commercial bank in the country, by assets. From 1998 until 2013, he served as the chairman of that board. At the time of his death, he was listed as one of the wealthiest individuals in Uganda.

Background and education
He was born in Buganda on 24 July 1936. He attended Mengo Senior School, in northwestern Kampala, Uganda's capital and largest city. Later, he studied at Aggrey Memorial School, also in Kampala. At an early age, he began engaging in import and export activities. In 1961, at the age of 25, he started his first formal company, Associated Battery Manufacturers Limited, in partnership with Chloride (UK) Plc..

Mulwana Group
The list of businesses that he owned included the following:

In 1961, at the age of 25, he partnered with Chloride (UK) Plc. to form Associated Battery Manufacturers Limited. Later, that business became Uganda Batteries Limited, a leading battery manufacturer in Uganda. Mulwana took majority control of the business in 1991.

Nice House of Plastics Limited is a company that he established in 1970. It manufactures plastic products, including toothbrushes, chairs, washbasins, jerry cans, and drinking cups.  

Jesa Mixed Farm Limited was formed in 1988.

Nsimbe Estate Limited was founded in 1992, in partnership with a strategic shareholder from Germany. The company grows, processes, and exports cut flowers.

Jesa Farm Dairy was established in 1994. It pasteurizes, processes, and packages milk and manufactures packed milk, butter, yoghurt. and ice cream.

Jesa Investments Limited, a commercial real estate development company, was founded in 2002.

Death
In early January 2013, James Mulwana, who received regular medical checkups from London and Thailand, entered Nakasero Hospital, an upscale private hospital in Kampala, on account of an abdominal ailment. At 4.00am, on the morning of Tuesday, 15 January 2013, he died, at the hospital.

According to his wishes, his body was laid to rest at his ancestral home in Masiriba Village, Mityana District, near the town of Bukomero. He is survived by one widow, Sarah Mulwana, two daughters; Primrose Mulwana and Barbara Mulwana and one son Geoffrey Mulwana, the heir. They continued to run the family businesses after his death.

See also
List of wealthiest people in Uganda
Economy of Uganda
Mengo Senior School
List of milk processing companies in Uganda
Dairy industry in Uganda

References

External links
 Website of Nice House of Plastics

1936 births
2013 deaths
Ganda people
Ugandan businesspeople
Ugandan industrialists
Ugandan bankers